is a former international table tennis player and coach from Japan.

He won a bronze medal at the 2000 World Team Table Tennis Championships in the Swaythling Cup (men's team event) with Seiko Iseki, Kōji Matsushita, Hiroshi Shibutani and Toshio Tasaki for Japan.

He competed in two Olympic Games in 1996 and 2004.

See also
 List of table tennis players
 List of World Table Tennis Championships medalists

References

Japanese male table tennis players
Japanese table tennis coaches
1976 births
Living people
Asian Games medalists in table tennis
Table tennis players at the 1998 Asian Games
Table tennis players at the 2002 Asian Games
Medalists at the 1998 Asian Games
Asian Games bronze medalists for Japan
Olympic table tennis players of Japan
Table tennis players at the 1996 Summer Olympics
Table tennis players at the 2004 Summer Olympics